Flemming og Kvik is a 1960 Danish coming-of-age film directed by Gabriel Axel.

Cast 
 Johannes Meyer
 Jørgen Reenberg
 Bjarne Forchhammer
 Berthe Qvistgaard
 Ghita Nørby
 Louis Miehe-Renard
 Gunnar Lauring
 Astrid Villaume

References

External links 
 
 

1960 films
Danish coming-of-age films
1960s Danish-language films
Films directed by Gabriel Axel
1960s coming-of-age films